Mortuary Drape is an Italian black metal band formed in the 1980s. They have released five LPs.

Discography
 Necromancy (demo, 1987)
 Doom Return (demo, 1989)
 All the Witches Dance (1994)
 Secret Sudaria (1997)
 Tolling 13 Knell (2000)
 Buried in Time (2004)
 Spiritual Independence (2014)

Tours
 Northern Continental Tour with Volahn, 2018

References

Further reading

External links
 

Musical groups established in the 1980s
Italian black metal musical groups